Tombstone is a historic city in Cochise County, Arizona, United States, founded in 1879 by prospector Ed Schieffelin in what was then Pima County, Arizona Territory. It became one of the last boomtowns in the American frontier. The town grew significantly into the mid-1880s as the local mines produced $40 to $85 million in silver bullion, the largest productive silver district in Arizona. Its population grew from 100 to around 14,000 in less than seven years. It is best known as the site of the Gunfight at the O.K. Corral and presently draws most of its revenue from tourism. It also houses the highest-rated brewery in the state of Arizona.

The town was established on Goose Flats, a mesa above the Goodenough Mine. Within two years of its founding, although far distant from any other metropolitan area, Tombstone had a bowling alley, four churches, an ice house, a school, two banks, three newspapers, and an ice cream parlor, alongside 110 saloons, 14 gambling halls, and numerous dance halls and brothels. All of these businesses were situated among and atop many silver mines. The gentlemen and ladies of Tombstone attended operas presented by visiting acting troupes at the Schieffelin Hall opera house, while the miners and cowboys saw shows at the Bird Cage Theatre and brothel.

Under the surface were tensions that grew into deadly conflict. The mining capitalists and the townspeople were largely Republicans from the Northern states. Many of the ranchers (some of whom—like the Clantons—were also rustlers or other criminal varieties) were Confederate sympathizers and Democrats. The booming city was only  from the U.S.–Mexico border and was an open market for cattle stolen from ranches in Sonora, Mexico, by a loosely organized band of outlaws known as The Cowboys. The Earp brothers—Wyatt, Virgil and Morgan—as well as Doc Holliday, arrived in December 1879 and mid-1880. The Earps had ongoing conflicts with Cowboys Ike and Billy Clanton, Frank and Tom McLaury, and Billy Claiborne. The Cowboys repeatedly threatened the Earps over many months until the conflict escalated into a shootout on October 26, 1881. The historic gunfight is often portrayed as occurring at the O.K. Corral, though it actually occurred a short distance away in an empty lot on Fremont Street.

In the mid-1880s, the silver mines penetrated the water table and the mining companies made significant investments in specialized pumps. A fire in 1886 destroyed the Grand Central hoist and the pumping plant, and it was deemed unprofitable to rebuild the costly pumps. The city nearly became a ghost town, saved only because it was the Cochise County seat until 1929. The city's population dwindled to a low of 646 in 1910, but grew to 1,380 by 2010. Tombstone has frequently been noted on lists of unusual place names.

History

Founding
Ed Schieffelin was briefly a scout for the U. S. Army headquartered at Camp Huachuca. Schieffelin frequently searched the wilderness looking for valuable ore samples. At the Santa Rita mines in nearby Santa Cruz Valley, three superintendents had been killed by Native Americans. When friend and fellow Army Scout Al Sieber learned what Schieffelin was up to, he is quoted as telling him, "The only rock you will find out there will be your own tombstone", or, according to another version of the story, "Better take your coffin with you, Ed; you will only find your tombstone there, and nothing else."

In 1877, Schieffelin used Brunckow's Cabin as a base of operations to survey the country. After many months, while working the hills east of the San Pedro River, he found pieces of silver ore in a dry wash on a high plateau called Goose Flats. It took him several more months to find the source. When he located the vein, he estimated it to be fifty feet long and twelve inches wide. Schieffelin took on a partner named William Griffith who financed the filing of the claim in return for a later claim for himself. Griffith filed Schieffelin's first claim, which was named Tombstone, on September 3, 1877. Another account says the first claim was called Graveyard "because it proved worthless and for no other reason."

When the first claims were filed, the initial settlement of tents and wooden shacks was located at Watervale, near the Lucky Cuss mine, with a population of about 100. The Goodenough Mine strike occurred shortly after. As the mill was being built, U.S. Deputy Mineral Surveyor Solon M. Allis finished surveying the new town's site in March 1879. Lots were immediately sold on Allen Street for $5.00 each. The town soon had some 40 cabins and about 100 residents. At the town's founding in March 1879, it took its name from Schieffelin's initial mining claim. By fall 1879, a few thousand hardy souls were living in a canvas and matchstick camp perched amidst the richest silver strike in the Arizona Territory.

When Cochise County was formed from the eastern portion of Pima County on February 1, 1881, Tombstone became the new county seat. Telegraph service to the town was established that same month. In early March 1880, the Schieffelins' Tombstone Mining and Milling Company which owned the original Goodenough Mine and the nearby Tough Nut Mine (among others), was sold to investors from Philadelphia.

On September 9, 1880, the richly appointed Grand Hotel was opened, adorned with fine oil paintings, thick Brussels carpets, toilet stands, elegant chandeliers, silk-covered furniture, walnut furniture, and a kitchen with hot and cold running water. At the height of the silver mining boom, when the population was about 10,000, the city was host to Kelly's Wine House, featuring 26 varieties of wine imported from Europe, a beer imported from Colorado named "Coors", cigars, a bowling alley, and many other amenities common to large cities.

Early conflicts

Under the surface were other tensions aggravating the simmering distrust. Most of the Cowboys were Confederate sympathizers and Democrats from Southern states, especially Texas. The mine and business owners, miners, townspeople and city lawmen including the Earps were largely Republicans from the Northern states. There was also the fundamental conflict over resources and land, with traditional, Southern-style "small government" agrarianism of the rural Cowboys contrasted to Northern-style “big-government” development.

The Mexican government taxed these items heavily and smugglers earned a handsome profit by sneaking these products across the border. The illegal cross-border smuggling contributed to the lawlessness of the region. Many of these crimes were carried out by outlaw elements labeled "Cow-boys", a loosely organized band of friends and acquaintances who teamed up for various crimes and came to each other's aid. The San Francisco Examiner wrote in an editorial, "Cowboys [are] the most reckless class of outlaws in that wild country...infinitely worse than the ordinary robber." At that time during the 1880s in Cochise County it was an insult to call a legitimate cattleman a "Cowboy". Legitimate cowmen were referred to as cattle herders or ranchers. The Cowboys were nonetheless welcome in town because of their free-spending habits, but shootings were common.

Gunfight at the O.K. Corral

On the evening of March 15, 1881, three Cochise County Cowboys attempted to rob a Kinnear & Company stagecoach carrying $26,000 in silver bullion (about $ in today's dollars), en route from Tombstone to Benson, Arizona, the nearest railroad freight terminal. Near Drew's Station, just outside Contention City, the popular and well-known driver Eli "Budd" Philpot, and a passenger named Peter Roerig riding in the rear dickey seat, were both shot and killed. Deputy U.S. Marshal Virgil Earp, with his temporary deputies and brothers Wyatt Earp and Morgan Earp, pursued the Cowboys suspected of the murders. That set off a chain of events that culminated, on October 26, 1881, in a gunfight in a vacant lot owned by photographer C. S. Fly near, but not in or at, the O.K. Corral, during which the lawmen and Doc Holliday killed Tom McLaury, Frank McLaury, and Billy Clanton.

The gunfight was the result of a personal, family, and political feud. Two months later, on the evening of December 28, 1881, Virgil Earp was ambushed and seriously wounded on the streets of Tombstone by hidden assailants shooting from the second story of an unfinished building. Although identified, the suspects provided witnesses who supplied alibis, and the men were not prosecuted. On March 18, 1882, while Morgan Earp was playing billiards at 10 p.m. at Campbell & Hatch in Allen Street — in the heart of Tombstone's still-current downtown — he was killed by a shot that struck his spine, as Wyatt looked on. Once again, the assailants were named but escaped arrest due to legal technicalities. Wyatt Earp, concluding that official justice was out of reach, but with warrants obtained via the U. S. Marshal's Office, led a posse on what became known as the Earp Vendetta Ride, pursuing and killing four of the men they held responsible.

Much of the Cowboy-related crime subsided after the Earp family left Arizona in early 1882, following the attempted murder of Tombstone Marshal Virgil Earp on 28 December 1881, and the murder of Deputy Marshal Morgan Earp on 18 March 1882. John Slaughter was elected Cochise County Sheriff in 1886 and served two terms. He hired Burt Alvord, who as a 15-year-old boy had witnessed the shootout between the Earps and Cowboys. Alford served very effectively for three years until he began to drink heavily and associate with outlaws, as had Earp-era County Sheriff Johnny Behan, a close friend and constant protector of the law-breaking Clanton family and their friends.

Boothill Graveyard

Tom McLaury, Frank McLaury, and Billy Clanton, killed in the O.K. Corral shootout, are among those buried in the town's Boothill Graveyard. Of the number of pioneer Boot Hill cemeteries in the Old West, so named because most of those buried in them had "died with their boots on", Boothill in Tombstone is one of the best-known.

Silver mining

Tombstone boomed, but founder Ed Schieffelin was more interested in prospecting than owning a mine. Ed was one-third partners with his brother Al Schieffelin and Richard Gird. There were several hundred mining claims near Tombstone, although the most productive were immediately south of town. These included the Goodenough, Toughnut, Contention, Grand Central, Lucky Cuss, Emerald, and Silver Thread.

Schieffelin left Tombstone to find more ore and when he returned four months later, Gird had lined up buyers for their interest in the Contention claim, which they sold for $10,000. It would later yield millions in silver. They sold a half-interest in the Lucky Cuss, and the other half turned into a steady stream of money. Al and Ed Schieffelin later sold their two-thirds interest in the Tough Nut for $1 million, and sometime later Gird sold his one-third interest for the same amount.

There are widely varying estimates of the value of gold and silver mined during the course of Tombstone's history. The Tombstone mines produced 32 million troy ounces (1,000 metric tons) of silver, more than any other mining district in Arizona. In 1883, writer Patrick Hamilton estimated that during the first four years of activity the mines produced about US$25,000,000 (approximately $ today). Other estimates include US$40 to US$85 million (about $ to $ today). Renewed mining is planned for the area.

One of the byproducts of the vast riches being produced, lawsuits became very prevalent. Between 1880 and 1885 the courts were clogged with many cases, often about land claims and properties. As a result, lawyers began to settle in Tombstone and became even wealthier than the miners and those who financed the mining. In addition, because many of the lawsuits required expert analysis of the underground, many geologists and engineers found employment in Tombstone and settled there. In the end, a thorough mapping of the area was completed by experts which resulted in maps documenting Tombstone's mining claims better than any other mining district of the West.

Mining was an easy task at Tombstone in the early days, ore being rich and close to the surface. One man could pull out ore equal to what three men produced elsewhere. Some residents of Tombstone became quite wealthy and spent considerable money during its boom years. Tombstone's first newspaper, the Nugget, was established in the fall of 1879. The Tombstone Epitaph was founded on May 1, 1880. As the fastest growing boomtown in the American Southwest, the silver industry and attendant wealth attracted many professionals and merchants who brought their wives and families. With them came churches and ministers. They brought a Victorian sensibility and became the town's elite. Many citizens of Tombstone dressed well, and up-to-date fashion could be seen in this growing mining town. Visitors expressed their amazement at the quality and diversity of products that were readily available in the area. The men who worked the mines were largely European immigrants. The Chinese did the town's laundry and provided other services. The Cowboys ran the countryside and stole cattle from haciendas across the international border in Sonora, Mexico. 

When the railroad was not built into Tombstone as had been planned, the increasingly sophisticated city of Tombstone remained relatively isolated, deep in a Federal territory that was largely an unpopulated desert and wilderness. Tombstone and its surrounding countryside also became known as one of the deadliest regions in the West. Water was hauled in until the Huachuca Water Company, funded in part by investors like Dr. George E. Goodfellow, built a  pipeline from the Huachuca Mountains in 1881. No sooner was a pipeline completed than Tombstone's silver mines struck water.

City growth and decline

By mid-1881 there were fancy restaurants, Vogan's Bowling Alley, four churches—Catholic, Episcopal, Presbyterian, and Methodist—an ice house, a school, the Schieffelin Hall opera house, two banks, three newspapers, and an ice cream parlor, alongside 110 saloons, 14 gambling halls, several Chinese restaurants, French, two Italian, numerous Mexican, several upscale "Continental" establishments, and many "home cooking" hot spots including Nellie Cashman's famous Rush House and numerous brothels all situated among and on top of a number of dirty, hardscrabble mines. The Arizona Telephone Company began installing poles and lines for the city's first telephone service on March 15, 1881.

Investors from the northeastern United States bought many of the leading mining operations. The mining itself was carried out by immigrants from Europe, chiefly Cornwall, Ireland and Germany. Chinese and Mexican labor provided services including laundry, construction, restaurants and hotels, but immigrant labor provoked backlash; an "Anti-Chinese League" was formed in the 1880s to boycott Chinese businesses and workers.

The mines and stamping mills ran three shifts. Miners were paid union wages of $4.00 per day working six 10-hour shifts per week. The approximately 6,000 men working in Tombstone generated more than $168,000 a week (approximately $ today) in income. The mostly young, single, male population spent their hard-earned cash on Allen Street, the major commercial center, open 24 hours a day.

The respectable folks saw traveling theater shows at Schieffelin Hall, opened on June 8, 1881. On December 25, 1881, the Bird Cage Theatre opened on Allen Street, offering the miners and Cowboys their kind of bawdy entertainment. One of the prime entertainments at the Bird Cage theatre was Cornish wrestling competitions, with the results being regularly published in the UK.

In 1882, The New York Times reported that "the Bird Cage Theatre is the wildest, wickedest night spot between Basin Street and the Barbary Coast." The Bird Cage remained open 24 hours a day, 7 days a week, 365 days a year until it closed its doors in 1889. Respectable women stayed on the north side of Allen Street. The prostitutes worked the saloons on the south side and in the southeast quarter of the town, as far as possible from the proper residential section north of Fremont Street.

By late 1881 Tombstone had more than 7,000 citizens, excluding all Chinese, Mexicans, women and children residents. At the height of the town's boom, the official population reached about 10,000, with several thousand more uncounted. In 1882, the Cochise County Courthouse was built at a cost of around $45,000.

Fires

Due to poor building practices and poor fire protection common to boomtown construction, Tombstone was hit by two major fires. On June 22, 1881, the first fire destroyed 66 businesses making up the eastern half of the business district. The fire began when a lit cigar ignited a barrel of whiskey in the Arcade Saloon.

On May 25, 1882, another, more destructive fire started in a Chinese laundry on Fifth Street between Toughnut and Allen streets. It destroyed the Grand Hotel and the Tivoli Saloon before it jumped Fremont Street, destroying more than 100 businesses and most of the business district. Lacking enough water to put out the flames, buildings in the fire's path were dynamited to deny the fire fuel. Total damages were estimated to be $700,000, far more than the estimated $250,000 insurance coverage. But rebuilding started right away nonetheless.

In March 1883, along one short stretch of Allen Street, there were drinking establishments in two principal hotels, the Eagle Brewery, Cancan Chop-House, French Rotisserie, Alhambra, Maison Dore, City of Paris, Brown's Saloon, Fashion Saloon, Miners' Home, Kelly's Wine-House, the Grotto, the Tivoli, and two more unnamed saloons.

Mines strike water
The Tough Nut Mine first experienced seepage in 1880. The flow wasn't at first large enough to stop work, but experienced miners thought the water flow would increase, and it did. Soon constant pumping with a  pump was insufficient. The silver ore deposits they sought were soon underwater.

Several mine managers traveled to San Francisco and met with the principal owners of the Contention Mine. They talked about options for draining the mines, and found the only system available for pumping water out of mines below  was the Cornish engine which had been used at the Comstock Lode in the 1870s. They bought and installed the huge Cornish engines in the Contention and Grand Central mines. By mid-February 1884, the engines were removing  of water every twenty-four hours. The city merchants celebrated the continued success of mining and the transfer of funds to their businesses. The Contention and the Grand Central found that their pumps were draining the mining district, benefiting other mines as well, but the other companies refused to pay a proportion of the expense.

On May 26, 1886, the Grand Central hoist and pumping plant burned. The fire was so intense that the metal components of the Cornish engine melted and warped. The headworks of the main mine shaft were also destroyed. Shortly afterward, the price of silver slid to 90 cents an ounce. The mines that remained operational laid off workers. Individuals who had thought about leaving Tombstone when the mine flooding started now took action. The price of silver briefly recovered for a while and a few mines began producing again, but never at the level reached in the early 1880s.

Tourism
The U.S. census recorded fewer than 1,900 residents in 1890 and fewer than 700 residents in 1900. Tombstone was saved from becoming a ghost town partly because it remained the Cochise County seat until 1929, when county residents voted to move county offices to nearby Bisbee. The classic Cochise County Courthouse and adjacent gallows yard in Tombstone are preserved as a museum.

Currently, tourism and western memorabilia are the main commercial enterprises; a July 2005 CNN article notes that Tombstone receives approximately 450,000 tourist visitors each year. This is about 300 tourists/year for each permanent resident. In contrast to its heyday, when it featured saloons open 24 hours and numerous houses of prostitution, Tombstone is now a staid community with few businesses open late. Tombstone and surrounding areas have a variety of lodging options, restaurants, and attractions. The town is located near other historic sites of interest, including Bisbee and the San Pedro Riparian area. Tombstone is a short drive away from Sierra Vista, which is considered the shopping hub of Cochise County.

East Allen Street is the center of Tombstone's tourist attractions, featuring three blocks of shaded boardwalks lined with gift shops, saloons, and eateries. Allen Street's historic district is closed to motor traffic from 3rd Street, the location of the city park and OK Corral, to 6th Street, where the Bird Cage Theatre is located. Additional sites of interest can be found throughout the city, even out on Highway 80, where Boothill Cemetery is found.

Performance events

Performance events help preserve the town's Wild West image and expose it to new visitors. The historic O.K. Corral has been preserved but is now surrounded by a wall. Fremont Street (modern Arizona Highway 80), where portions of the gunfight took place, is open to the public. Mannequins are used to depict the location of the participants as recorded by Wyatt Earp. Visitors may pay to see a reenactment of the gunfight. Helldorado Days is Tombstone's oldest festival and celebrates the community's wild days of the 1880s.

World's largest rose bush

According to Guinness, the world's largest rosebush was planted in Tombstone in 1885 and still flourishes in the city's sunny climate. The Lady Banksia rose originated in Scotland. Mary Gee was the wife of mining engineer Henry Gee, who worked for the Vizina Mining Co. Mary's family sent the homesick bride a box of rooted cuttings from her home country. She planted one of the roses by the patio of the Vizina Mining Company's boarding house, the first adobe building in town, located at 4th and Toughnut Street across from the later site of the railroad depot. She and Henry lived in the boarding house when they first arrived in Tombstone.

The building was later renamed the Cochise House Hotel, and from 1909 to 1936 it was known as the Arcade Hotel.  By the 1930s, the rose bush had grown to shade the entire patio and became a popular site for tourists.  The hotel was later renamed the Rose Tree Inn and then the Rose Tree Inn Museum. The museum curator tells visitors that all Banks roses growing in the U.S. today are descendants of the Tombstone rose.

The rose bush is walled off, and the inn charges admission to view it.

Historic district

The Tombstone Historic District is a National Historic Landmark District. The town's focus on tourism has threatened the town's designation as a National Historic Landmark District, a designation it earned in 1961 as "one of the best preserved specimens of the rugged frontier town of the 1870s and '80s". In 2004, the National Park Service declared that Tombstone's historic designation was threatened, and asked the community to develop an appropriate stewardship program.

The National Park Service noted inappropriate alterations to the district included:
 Placing "historic" dates on new buildings
 Failing to distinguish new construction from historic structures
 Covering authentic historic elevations with inappropriate materials
 Replacing historic features instead of repairing them
 Replacing missing historic features with conjectural and unsubstantiated materials
 Building incompatible additions to existing historic structures and new incompatible buildings within the historic district
 Using illuminated signage, including blinking lights surrounding historic signs
 Installing hitching rails and Spanish tile-covered store porches when such architectural features never existed within Tombstone

Historical buildings include Schieffelin Hall, the opera house built by Al Schieffelin in 1881, and the Cochise County Courthouse. The courthouse was largely unused and then vacant after the county seat was moved to Bisbee. An attempt was made to turn it into hotel in the 1940s, and when that failed it stood empty until 1955. The Tombstone Restoration Commission acquired the courthouse and developed it as a historical museum that opened in 1959. It features exhibits and thousands of artifacts documenting Tombstone's past.

This included large Victorian ceiling lamps and the inlaid‐patterned wood floor.

Geography and geology

The Tombstone District located at  (31.715940, −110.064827) sits atop a mesa (elevation ) in the San Pedro River valley between the Huachuca Mountains and Whetstone Mountains to the west, and the Mules and the Dragoon Mountains to the east.

The silver-bearing Tombstone Hills around the city are caused by a local intrusion of porphyry through a limestone capping.

When actively mined, the silver vein of argentiferous galena (silver-bearing lead ore) was large and well defined. The silver and lead was easily milled and smelted. The lead content sometimes was as much as 50 per cent of the ore, and assays proved the silver content ran as high as $105.00 per ton in 1881 dollars.

The underlying basement rocks are fine-grained Pinal Schist which is intruded by gneissic granite. The outcrop is in a small area south of the principal mines.

Overlying the Naco Limestone is an unconformable Mesozoic series of conglomerate, thick-bedded quartzites, and shales, with two or three lenses of soft, bluish-gray limestone. Into these formations intruded large bodies of quartz monzonite and by dikes of quartz monzonite-porphyry and diorite-porphyry. Structural faulting occurs throughout the district especially immediately south of Tombstone, where the strata are closely folded.

Tombstone District ores have been produced geologically in three or more ways.

They may have been formed in argentiferous (silver-bearing) lead sulfide containing spotty amounts of copper and zinc. These deposits are usually deeply oxidized and enriched by irregular replacement bodies along mineralized fissure zones and anticlinal rolls cut by Paleozoic and Mesozoic sedimentary formations. Ore bodies are often closely associated with newer cross-cutting intrusive dikes of Laramide.

Ore deposits were formed by base metal mineralization occurring with oxidation found in fault and fracture zones in Laramide volcanics and quartz latite porphyry intrusives.

Silver ore was also occurred in manganese oxides with some argentiferous deposits in lenticular or pipe-like replacement bodies along fracture and fault zones, usually in Pennsylvanian-Permian age Naco Group limestones.

Climate
Tombstone has a typical Arizona semi-arid climate (Köppen BSk/BSh) with three basic seasons. Winter, from October to March, features mild to warm days and chilly nights, with minima falling to under  on 28.4 nights, although snowfall is almost unknown, with the median being zero and the heaviest monthly fall being  in January 1916, of which  fell on January 16. The coldest temperature record in Tombstone has been  on December 8, 1978.

The wettest month has been July 2008 when  fell and fifteen days saw at least  of rainfall – though the record for the most such days in a month stands at eighteen, in July 1930.

Demographics

As of the census of 2000, there were 1,504 people, 694 households, and 419 families residing in the city. The racial makeup of the city was 87.4% White, 0.6% Black or African American, 1.0% Native American, 0.3% Asian, 8.2% from other races, and 2.5% from two or more races. 24.1% of the population were Hispanic or Latino of any race.

There were 694 households, out of which 20.2% had children under the age of 18 living with them, 47.6% were married couples living together, 7.9% had a female householder with no husband present, and 39.5% were non-families. 32.9% of all households were made up of individuals, and 15.3% had someone living alone who was 65 years of age or older. The average household size was 2.17 and the average family size was 2.73.

In the city, the age distribution of the population shows 19.3% under the age of 18, 4.9% from 18 to 24, 19.9% from 25 to 44, 32.5% from 45 to 64, and 23.3% who were 65 years of age or older. The median age was 49 years. For every 100 females, there were 94.3 males. For every 100 females age 18 and over, there were 91.0 males.

The median income for a household in the city was $26,571, and the median income for a family was $33,750. Males had a median income of $26,923 versus $18,846 for females. The per capita income for the city was $15,447. About 13.0% of families and 17.4% of the population were below the poverty line, including 22.6% of those under age 18 and 13.1% of those age 65 or over. In 2010, the total population was 1,380.

Education
Tombstone Unified School District serves Tombstone. The district schools in Tombstone are Walter J. Meyer Elementary School and Tombstone High School. Tombstone is within the Cochise Technology District which assists in the development of career and technical education programs for high school students.

Historic properties

Several properties in Tombstone have been included in the National Register of Historic Places. The following are images of some of these properties:

In popular culture

Television
 The 1957–1960 series Tombstone Territory is set in Tombstone. It followed the adventures of fictional Sheriff Clay Hollister (Pat Conway) as he preserved peace in and around the town. Each episode was introduced and narrated by the fictional editor of The Tombstone Epitaph, Harris Claibourne (Richard Eastham).
 The 1966 Doctor Who third season serial The Gunfighters is set in Tombstone. In it, the time traveling First Doctor (William Hartnell) and his companions become involved with the events leading up to the Gunfight at the O.K. Corral.
 The 1969 Death Valley Days episode "The Angel of Tombstone" features a fictional depiction of Tombstone restaurant proprietor Nellie Cashman (Grace Lee Whitney).
 The 2011 Fact or Faked: Paranormal Files episode "Old West Hauntings/Freeway Flyer" features an investigation into the alleged appearance of a coffin-shaped apparition in a mirror at Tombstone's Bird Cage Theatre.
 Set in Tombstone was the heavily fictionalized TV series The Life and Legend of Wyatt Earp, starring Hugh O'Brian in the title role. Steve Brodie played Behan in nine episodes of the series. Douglas Fowley played Doc.

See also

 Ten Percent Ring
 Confederate Arizona
 Arizona Territory in the American Civil War

References

Further reading
 Craig, R. Bruce, editor (2017). Portrait of a Prospector: Edward Schieffelin's Own Story. Norman: University of Oklahoma Press.

External links

 City of Tombstone official website
 Tombstone Arizona Information and Business Directory
 Official City of Tombstone Arizona Information and Business Directory
 Tombstone Chamber of Commerce
 A tombstone in Boot Hill Cemetery in Tombstone
 Tombstone – ghosttowns.com

Tombstone, Arizona
Cities in Arizona
Cities in Cochise County, Arizona
1879 establishments in Arizona Territory
Boot Hill cemeteries
Cemeteries in Arizona
Ghost towns in Arizona
Cochise County conflict
Geological type localities